Saint Vincent and the Grenadines requires its residents to register their motor vehicles and display vehicle registration plates. Current plates are European standard 520 mm × 110 mm, and plates are white or silver on black, or black on reflective white (front) and black on reflective yellow (rear) in the British style, are owner provided and come in different styles.

References

Saint Vincent and the Grenadines
Transport in Saint Vincent and the Grenadines
Saint Vincent and the Grenadines transport-related lists